Radojka Francoti (born 20 August 1952) is a Yugoslav athlete. She competed in the women's long jump at the 1972 Summer Olympics and the 1976 Summer Olympics.

References

1952 births
Living people
Athletes (track and field) at the 1972 Summer Olympics
Athletes (track and field) at the 1976 Summer Olympics
Croatian female long jumpers
Yugoslav female long jumpers
Olympic athletes of Yugoslavia
Place of birth missing (living people)